Étienne Louis Hector de Joly (22 April 1756 – 3 April 1837) was a French Freemason and politician. He was minister of the interior and minister of justice in the Government of France.

Bibliography 

 Georges Bordonove, Louis XVII et l'énigme du Temple, 1995
 Alain Decaux, Louis XVII retrouvé, Perrin, 1947
 Gruau, dit de la Barre, Louis XVII, Intrigues dévoilées (Consultable en ligne)
 Dejoly, Étienne-Louis-Hector : Mémoires inédits de E.-L.-H. Dejoly sur la journée du 10 août 1792, Édition critique avec une introduction et des notes par Jacques Godechot, Paris, Presses universitaires de France ; (Nancy, impr. de G. Thomas), 1947.

External links 

 Etienne de Joly sur ville-creteil.fr.

1756 births
1837 deaths
French Freemasons
French interior ministers
French Ministers of Justice